Hatrant, formerly Çınarlısu, is a village in the Tillo District of Siirt Province in Turkey. The village is populated by Kurds of the Keşkoliyan tribe and had a population of 308 in 2021.

The hamlets of Çavuşlu and Erenler are attached to Akyayla.

References 

Kurdish settlements in Siirt Province
Villages in Tillo District